Intercept may refer to:
X-intercept, the point where a line crosses the x-axis
Y-intercept, the point where a line crosses the y-axis
Interception, a play in various forms of football
The Mona Intercept, a 1980 thriller novel by Donald Hamilton
Operation Intercept, an anti-drug measure announced by President Nixon
Telephone tapping, the monitoring of telephone and Internet conversations by a third party
Tax refund intercept
Samsung Intercept (SPH-M910), an Android smartphone
Visual Intercept, a Microsoft Windows-based software defect tracking system
Intermodulation Intercept Point, a measure of an electrical device's linearity
Intercept message, a telephone recording informing the caller that the call cannot be completed
The Intercept, an online news publication edited by Glenn Greenwald, Laura Poitras, and Jeremy Scahill

See also
Interception (disambiguation)
Interceptor (disambiguation)
Intercept theorem, an important theorem in elementary geometry about the ratios of various line segments